Sir James O'Connell, 1st Baronet (10 January 1786 – 28 July 1872) was an Irish baronet and younger brother of Daniel O'Connell.

Life

James O’Connell established himself at Killarney (County Kerry, Ireland) in the early nineteenth century, leasing lands from the Herbert family of Muckross House. On 29 October 1869 he was created a "Baronet of Lakeview and of Ballybeggan".

In 1870 Sir James O’Connell built "Lakeview House", replacing an earlier house called "Lakeville". It was built in 1740 and located in the southern end of the townland of "Maulagh". Lakeview House still exists and is in the possession of descendants of Sir James O'Connell.

His estate amounted to over 18,000 acres in the 1870s and included lands in the parish of Ratass in the barony of Trughanacmy (County Kerry).

Family

Sir James was the son of Morgan O'Connell, a general store proprietor, and Catherine O'Mullane - both parents being from a Roman Catholic family. O'Connell was the younger brother of Daniel O'Connell and the nephew of the soldier Lieutenant-General Daniel Charles, Count O'Connell. He was married to Jane O'Donoghue and had five children, the eldest son succeeding as Sir Maurice James O'Connell, 2nd Baronet (1821–1896).

See also
 O'Connell baronets

References

External links
thepeerage.com
Homepage of Lakeview House and Estate

1786 births
1872 deaths
19th-century Irish people
People from County Kerry
Baronets in the Baronetage of the United Kingdom
James